The following is a list of presidents of Göztepe.

Presidents

References

Notes

Göztepe S.K.